Jehangir Ratanji Dadabhoy Tata (29 July 1904 – 29 November 1993) was an Indian aviator, industrialist, entrepreneur and chairman of Tata Group.

Born into the Tata Family of India, he was the son of noted businessman Ratanji Dadabhoy Tata and his wife Suzanne Brière. His mother was the first woman in India to drive a car and, in 1929, he became the first licensed pilot in India. He is also best known for being the founder of several industries under the Tata Group, including Tata Consultancy Services, Tata Motors, Titan Industries, Tata Salt, Voltas and Air India. In 1983, he was awarded the French Legion of Honour and in 1955 and 1992, he received two of India's highest civilian awards the Padma Vibhushan and the Bharat Ratna. These honours were bestowed on him for his contributions to Indian industry.

Early life 

J. R. D. Tata was born as king on 29 July 1904 to an Indian Parsi family in Paris, France. He was the second child of businessman Ratanji Dadabhoy Tata and his French wife, Suzanne "Sooni" Brière. His father was the first cousin of Jamsetji Tata, a pioneer industrialist in India. He had one elder sister Sylla, a younger sister Rodabeh and two younger brothers Darab and Jamshed (called Jimmy) Tata. His sister, Sylla, was married to Dinshaw Maneckji Petit, the third baronet of Petits. His sister's sister-in-law, Rattanbai Petit, was the wife of Muhammad Ali Jinnah, who later became the founder of Pakistan in August 1947. Jinnah and Rattanbai's daughter Dina Jinnah, was married to Bombay Dyeing chairman Neville Wadia who was the son of Sir Ness Wadia and Lady Eveylne Clara Powell Wadia. Neville and Dina had two children, Nusli Wadia and Diana N Wadia. Nusli is the current chairman of the Wadia Group. Nusli married Maureen Waida and they have two children, Jehangir Wadia and Ness Wadia.

As his mother was French, he spent much of his childhood in France and as a result, French was his first language. He attended the Janson De Sailly School in Paris. One of the teachers at that school used to call him L'Egyptien.

He attended the Cathedral and John Connon School, Bombay. Tata was educated in London, Japan, France and India. When his father joined the Tata company he moved the whole family to London. During this time, J. R. D.'s mother died at the age of 43 while his father was in India and his family was in France.

After his mother's death, Ratanji Dadabhoy Tata decided to move his family to India and sent J. R. D. to England for higher studies in October 1923. He was enrolled in a grammar school, and was interested in studying engineering at Cambridge University. However, as a citizen of France J. R. D. had to enlist in the army for at least a year. In between grammar school and his time in the army, he spent a brief spell at home in Bombay. After joining the French Army he was posted into a regiment of spahis. Upon discovering Tata could not only read and write French and English, but could type as well, a colonel had him assigned as a secretary in his office. After his time in the French Army, his father decided to bring him back to India and he joined the Tata Company.

In 1929, Tata renounced his French citizenship and became an Indian citizen. In 1930 Tata married Thelma Vicaji, the niece of Jack Vicaji, a colourful lawyer whom he hired to defend him on a charge of driving his Bugatti too fast along Bombay's main promenade, Marine Drive. Previously he had been engaged to Dinbai Mehta, the future mother of The Economist editor Shapur Kharegat.

While he was born to a Parsi father, and his French mother converted to Zoroastrianism, J. R. D. was agnostic. He found some Parsi religious customs like their funeral rites and their exclusiveness irksome. He adhered to the three basic tenets of Zoroastrianism, which were good thoughts, good words, and good deeds, but he did not profess belief or disbelief in God.

Career 
When Tata was in tour, he was inspired by his friend's father, aviation pioneer Louis Blériot, the first man to fly across the English Channel, and took to flying. On 10 February 1929, Tata obtained the first license issued in India.
He later came to be known as the "Father of Indian civil aviation". He founded India's first commercial airline, Tata Airlines in 1932, which became Air India in 1946, now India's national airline. He and Nevill Vintcent worked together in building Tata Airlines. They were also good friends. In 1929, J. R. D. became one of the first Indians to be granted a commercial's license. In 1932 Tata Aviation Service, the forerunner to Tata Airline and Air India, took to the skies. That same year he flew the first commercial mail flight to Juhu, in a de Havilland Puss Moth.

The first flight in the History of Indian aviation lifted off from Drigh in Karachi to Madras with J. R. D. at the controls of a Puss on 15 October 1932. J. R. D. nourished and nurtured his airline baby through to 1953, when the government of Jawaharlal Nehru nationalised Air India. It was a decision J. R. D. had fought against tooth and nail.

He joined Tata Sons as an unpaid apprentice in 1925. In 1938, at the age of 34, Tata was elected Chairman of Tata Sons making him the head of the largest industrial group in India. He took over as Chairman of Tata Sons from his second cousin Nowroji Saklatwala. For decades, he directed the huge Tata Group of companies, with major interests in steel, engineering, power, chemicals and hospitality. He was famous for succeeding in business while maintaining high ethical standards – refusing to bribe politicians or use the black market.

Under his chairmanship, the assets of the Tata Group grew from US$100 million to over US$5 billion. He started with 14 enterprises under his leadership and half a century later on 26 July 1988, when he left, Tata Sons was a conglomerate of 95 enterprises which they either started or in which they had controlling interest.

He was the trustee of the Sir Dorabji Tata Trust from its inception in 1932 for over half a century. Under his guidance, this Trust established Asia's first cancer facility, the Tata Memorial Centre for Cancer, Research and Treatment, Bombay in 1941. He also founded the Tata Institute of Social Sciences (TISS, 1936), the Tata Institute of Fundamental Research (TIFR, 1945), and the National Center for Performing Arts.

In 1945, he founded Tata Motors. In 1948, Tata launched Air India International as India's first international airline. In 1953, the Indian Government appointed Tata as Chairman of Air India and a director on the Board of Indian Airlines – a position he retained for 25 years. For his crowning achievements in aviation, he was bestowed with the title of Honorary Air Commodore of India.

Tata cared greatly for his workers. In 1956, he initiated a programme of closer 'employee association with management' to give workers a stronger voice in the affairs of the company. He firmly believed in employee welfare and espoused the principles of an eight-hour working day, free medical aid, workers' provident scheme, and workmen's accident compensation schemes, which were later, adopted as statutory requirements in India.

He was also a founding member of the first Governing Body of NCAER, the National Council of Applied Economic Research in New Delhi, India's first independent economic policy institute established in 1956. In 1968, he founded Tata Consultancy Services as Tata Computer Centre. In 1979, Tata Steel instituted a new practice: a worker being deemed to be "at work" from the moment he leaves home for work until he returns home from work. This made the company financially liable to the worker for any mishap on the way to and from work. In 1987, he founded Titan Industries. Jamshedpur was also selected as a UN Global Compact City because of the quality of life, conditions of sanitation, roads and welfare that were offered by Tata Steel.

Support of emergency powers in 1975 
Tata was also controversially supportive of the declaration of emergency powers by Prime Minister, Indira Gandhi, in 1975. He is quoted to have told a reporter of the Times, "things had gone too far. You can't imagine what we've been through here—strikes, boycotts, demonstrations. Why, there were days I couldn't walk out of my house into the streets. The parliamentary system is not suited to our needs."

Awards and honours 

Tata received a number of awards. He was conferred the honorary rank of group captain by the Indian Air Force in 1948, was promoted to the Air Commodore rank (equivalent to Brigadier in the army) on 4 October 1966, and was further promoted on 1 April 1974 to the Air Vice Marshal rank. Several international awards for aviation were given to him – the Tony Jannus Award in March 1979, the Gold Air Medal of the Fédération Aéronautique Internationale in 1985, the Edward Warner Award of the International Civil Aviation Organisation, Canada in 1986 and the Daniel Guggenheim Medal in 1988. He received the Padma Vibhushan in 1955. The French Legion of Honour was bestowed on him in 1983. In 1992, because of his selfless humanitarian endeavours, Tata was awarded India's highest civilian honour, the Bharat Ratna. In the same year, Tata was also bestowed with the United Nations Population Award for his crusading endeavours towards initiating and successfully implementing the family planning movement in India, much before it became an official government policy.
In his memory, the Government of Maharashtra named its first double-decker bridge the Bharatratna JRD Tata Overbridge at Nasik Phata, Pimpri Chinchwad.

Death and legacy 
Tata died in Geneva, Switzerland on 29 November 1993 at the age of 89 of a kidney infection. He said a few days before his passing: "Comme c'est doux de mourir" ("How gentle it is to die").

Upon his death, the Indian Parliament was adjourned in his memory – an honour not usually given to persons who are not members of parliament. He was buried at the Père Lachaise Cemetery in Paris.

In 2012, Tata was ranked the sixth "The Greatest Indian" in an Outlook magazine poll, "conducted in conjunction with CNN-IBN and History18 Channels with BBC."

See also 

The Greatest Indian
R. M. Lala
Jamsetji Tata
Ratanji Dadabhoy Tata
Rattanbai Petit
Dorabji Tata

References

Bibliography

External links 

Tata Family Tree
 Brief Lifestory of JRD Tata 
  
  
 Biography at newindiadigest.com 
 Biography at tata.com 

1904 births
1993 deaths
Aviation history of India
Aviation pioneers
Indian people of French descent
Indian aviators
Indian chief executives
Parsi people from Mumbai
Businesspeople from Mumbai
Indian agnostics
Recipients of the Bharat Ratna
Recipients of the Padma Vibhushan in trade & industry
Soldiers of the French Foreign Legion
Jehangir Ratanji Dadabhoy
Businesspeople in steel
Businesspeople in information technology
Businesspeople in coffee
Chief executives in the automobile industry
Indian founders of automobile manufacturers
Bessemer Gold Medal
Tata Group people
Burials at Père Lachaise Cemetery
Businesspeople from Paris
Cathedral and John Connon School alumni
Indian Freemasons